Chris Pointer (born February 2, 1976) is a former defensive back in the Arena Football League. He played for the Norfolk Nighthawks, Toronto Phantoms, New Jersey Gladiators, the New Orleans VooDoo, the Kansas City Brigade, Nashville Kats and Columbus Destroyers.

Early life
Pointer attended Louisville Male High School, where he was a member of the football and track and field teams.

College years
Pointer attended Kentucky State University and was a three-year starter at cornerback.

References

External links
Stats

1976 births
Living people
Players of American football from Louisville, Kentucky
American football defensive ends
New Jersey Gladiators players
New Orleans VooDoo players
Kansas City Brigade players
Nashville Kats players
Norfolk Nighthawks players
Toronto Phantoms players
Kentucky State Thorobreds football players